Dans la Nuit is an album by French clarinetist Louis Sclavis recorded in 2000 and released on the ECM label. The album was initialised through an invitation of French director Bertrand Tavernier to Sclavis, he agreed and wrote this music to Charles Vanel's 1929 film Dans la nuit.

Reception
The Allmusic review by Glenn Astarita awarded the album 4½ stars stating "Sclavis' multi-hued and altogether vividly constructed arrangements hit the mark in a noticeably huge way".

Track listing
All compositions by Louis Sclavis except as indicated
 "Dia Dia" - 1:15   
 "Le Travail" - 6:00   
 "Dans la Nuit" - 3:39   
 "Fête Foraine" - 4:57   
 "Retour de Noce" - 2:17   
 "Mauvais Rêve" - 1:41   
 "Amour et Beauté" - 2:49   
 "L'Accident Part 1" - 3:35   
 "L'Accident Part 2" - 3:17   
 "Le Miroir" (Vincent Courtois, Jean-Louis Matinier, François Merville, Louis Sclavis) - 4:43   
 "Dans la Nuit" - 1:11   
 "La Fuite" (Courtois, Matinier, Merville, Sclavis) - 5:14   
 "La Peur du Noir" (Matinier) - 1:27   
 "Les 2 Visages" - 6:19   
 "Dia Dia" - 5:00   
 "Dans la Nuit" - 1:29
Recorded at Studios La Buissonne in Pernes-Les-Fontaines, France in October 2000.

Personnel
Louis Sclavis — clarinet, bass clarinet
Jean-Louis Matinier — accordion
Dominique Pifarély — violin
Vincent Courtois — cello
François Merville — percussion, marimba

References

ECM Records albums
Louis Sclavis albums
2002 albums
Albums produced by Manfred Eicher